The 2018–19 season was Deportivo de La Coruña's 112th season in existence and the club's first season back in the second division of Spanish football. In addition to the domestic league, Deportivo de La Coruña participated in this season's edition of the Copa del Rey. The season covered the period from 1 July 2018 to 30 June 2019.

Players

Current squad

Out on loan

Transfers

In

Out

Pre-season and friendlies

Competitions

Overview

Segunda División

League table

Results summary

Results by round

Matches
The fixtures were revealed on 24 July 2018.

References

External links

Deportivo de La Coruña seasons
Deportivo de La Coruña